Gordon Alexander Thomas Bagier (7 July 1924 – 8 April 2012) was a British Labour Party politician.

Early life
Bagier was educated at Pendower Secondary Technical School (merged with neighbouring St Cuthbert's Grammar School to become its lower school in 1977) on Fox and Hounds Lane (off the A186) in Benwell, Newcastle upon Tyne. He served in the Royal Marines from 1941 to 1945, as a gunner aboard the light cruiser , and later played a part in her preservation. He was a signals inspector on British Railways. He served as a councillor on Keighley Borough Council 1956–60 and Sowerby Bridge Urban Council from 1962, and as President of the Yorkshire District Council of the National Union of Railwaymen.

Parliamentary career
At the 1964 general election, Bagier stood in the Sunderland South constituency, where he defeated the sitting Conservative Member of Parliament, Paul Williams.  He held the seat until his retirement at the 1987 general election, when his successor was the left-wing journalist Chris Mullin.

Personal life
He married Violet Sinclair in 1949. They had two sons and two daughters. He died on 8 April 2012.

References
The Times Guide to the House of Commons, Times Newspapers Ltd, 1966 & 1983

Notes

Labour Party (UK) MPs for English constituencies
National Union of Railwaymen-sponsored MPs
UK MPs 1964–1966
UK MPs 1966–1970
UK MPs 1970–1974
UK MPs 1974
UK MPs 1974–1979
UK MPs 1979–1983
UK MPs 1983–1987
Councillors in West Yorkshire
1924 births
2012 deaths
Politicians from Newcastle upon Tyne
British Rail people
Royal Marines ranks
Royal Marines personnel of World War II